Lough Cullen is the only lake in County Kilkenny,  Ireland. The lake has numerous legends attached to it.

Near the town of Kilmacow, Loughcullen is name of the local area. Located in the civil parish Kilcolumb in the barony of Ida, just  from Waterford City it is close to the County Waterford border.

Loughcullen is notable in the region for being very supportive of the Kilkenny Cats hurling team. On match days and particularly when Kilkenny is participating in the All Ireland, Loughcullen is transformed into Amber and Black, the colours of the hurling team.

History
Lough Cullen Co-operative Agriculture and Dairy Society (C.D.S) was set up in 1904. Loughcullen consists generally of land owned by farms in neighbouring Big Wood. Loughcullen used to be the site for the Loughcullen Creamery which served all local farmers however the creamery has closed and is now a supplier to local agricultural workers.

See also
 List of townlands in County Kilkenny

Notes

References

Further reading

External links
 
 
 

Townlands of County Kilkenny
Geography of County Kilkenny